Words Untold & Dreams Unlived is the first full-length studio album by symphonic metal band Serenity released on April 27, 2007, in Europe and on May 8 in North America, followed by releases in Russia, Japan and south-eastern Asia. The album was released under Napalm Records and produced by Jan Vacik and Oliver Philipps at Dreamsound Studios in Munich.

Words Untold & Dreams Unlived has all the elements and strong points of a power metal album, but not as many melodic and symphonic tones as in Serenity's later albums.

Artworks and layout for Words Untold & Dreams Unlived were created by www.seth-design.com and all photos for the album were shot by Caroline Traitler.

History 

Words Untold & Dreams Unlived was released on April 27, 2007, in Europe and on May 8 in North America. The album was then released in Russia and Japan. The album contains 10 tracks, including songs that appeared on Serenity's demo album Engraved Within (tracks 5, 6, 8, and 10).

Track listing

Personnel

The band 
 Georg Neuhauser – Lead Vocals
 Thomas Buchberger – Lead and Rhythm Guitars 
 Simon Holzknecht – Bass Guitar
 Mario Hirzinger – Keyboards and Back Vocals
 Andreas Schipflinger – Drums and Backing Vocals

Guest musicians 
 Lanvall from (Edenbridge)
 Axumis/Maggo Wenzel from (Tristwood/Inzest) - Death Vocals (on track #2)

Production
 Produced by Jan Vacik
 All songs written by Buchberger/Hirzinger/Neuhauser, except "Dead Man Walking."
 "Dead Man Walking" written by Buchberger/Neuhauser/Hirzinger/Anker
 Additional recordings at Serenity Studios Wörgl/Mayrhofen
 Mixed by Teropekka Virtanen and Jan Vacik
 Mastered by Mika Jussila

References

External links 
 

2007 debut albums
Napalm Records albums
Serenity (band) albums